Ilarion Ridge is a partly ice-free ridge of elevation 240 m situated in Breznik Heights on Greenwich Island, Antarctica.  Extending along the south coast of Hardy Cove, 2 km southwest of Parchevich Ridge, 1.9 km east-northeast of Lyutitsa Nunatak, 2.5 km northeast of Vratsa Peak, 1.3 km north of St. Kiprian Peak, and 2.6 km north-northwest of Fort Point.  Overlooking Musala Glacier to the south.  Bulgarian topographic survey Tangra 2004/05.  Named after Metropolitan Ilarion Makariopolski (1812–75), a leading figure in the restoration of the autocephalous Bulgarian Church in 1870.

Maps
 L.L. Ivanov et al. Antarctica: Livingston Island and Greenwich Island, South Shetland Islands. Scale 1:100000 topographic map. Sofia: Antarctic Place-names Commission of Bulgaria, 2005.
 L.L. Ivanov. Antarctica: Livingston Island and Greenwich, Robert, Snow and Smith Islands. Scale 1:120000 topographic map.  Troyan: Manfred Wörner Foundation, 2009.

References
 Ilarion Ridge. SCAR Composite Gazetteer of Antarctica
 Bulgarian Antarctic Gazetteer. Antarctic Place-names Commission. (details in Bulgarian, basic data in English)

External links
 Ilarion Ridge. Copernix satellite image

Ridges of Greenwich Island
Bulgaria and the Antarctic